Diomandé Mohamed Baba (born 30 October 2001), commonly known as Mohamed Diomande, is an Ivorian professional footballer who plays as a midfielder for Nordsjælland in the Danish Superliga.

Club career

Nordsjælland 
Growing up in Wassakara in the Yopougon suburb of the Ivorian capital of Abidjan, Diomande came to the Danish club FC Nordsjælland through the Right to Dream Academy in Ghana. He made his professional debut on 19 February 2020 in a Danish Superliga match against AC Horsens, starting at central midfield in the 6–0 home win before being replaced in the 60th minute by Clinton Antwi. Diomande was subsequently praised by head coach Flemming Pedersen, who stated that "[h]e covers a large area of the pitch [...] he's a good dribbler and physically strong. When he adjusts to the Superliga, he will also become one of our most important players." He finished his first season as a senior player with 15 total appearances.

Diomande scored his first goal for Nordsjælland on 13 September 2020, the first matchday of the 2020–21 season, in a 3–2 loss to Brøndby IF.

Career statistics

References

Living people
2001 births
Association football midfielders
Ivorian footballers
Footballers from Abidjan
Ivorian expatriate footballers
Ivorian expatriate sportspeople in Denmark
Expatriate men's footballers in Denmark
Right to Dream Academy players
FC Nordsjælland players
Danish Superliga players